"Hand on the Pump" is a single by hip hop group Cypress Hill, released from their self-titled debut album. While still successful, the song did not reach the popularity of previous singles "How I Could Just Kill a Man" and "The Phuncky Feel One". The song was re-recorded and released as a single in 1992 under the name "Hand on the Glock"; this version was also released on the "Latin Lingo" single.

Music video
Like many of the group's early music videos, the video simply shows the members performing the song in various locations, alongside various clips from an unnamed cinematic title filmed in Red Hook, New York

Track listing

Chart positions

Notes
A  "Hand on the Pump" did not enter the Hot R&B/Hip-Hop Songs chart, but peaked at number 6 on the Bubbling Under R&B/Hip-Hop Singles chart, which acts as a 25-song extension to the R&B/Hip-Hop Songs chart.
  "Hand on the Pump" samples Gene Chandler's "The Duke of Earl" on the 1962 album, Vee Jay.

References

1991 songs
1991 singles
Cypress Hill songs
Ruffhouse Records singles
Hardcore hip hop songs
Songs written by DJ Muggs
Songs written by B-Real
Song recordings produced by DJ Muggs
Gangsta rap songs